Cormac Folan (born 9 July 1983) is an Irish rower. He competed in the men's coxless four event at the 2008 Summer Olympics. From Barna in Connemara, County Galway, Folan rowed for NUI Galway Boat Club.

References

External links
 

1983 births
Living people
Alumni of the University of Galway
Irish male rowers
Olympic rowers of Ireland
Rowers at the 2008 Summer Olympics
Sportspeople from County Galway
21st-century Irish people